The 2019 Swedish Golf Tour was the 36th season of the Swedish Golf Tour.

All tournaments also featured on the 2019 Nordic Golf League.

Schedule
The following table lists official events during the 2019 season.

Order of Merit
The Order of Merit was based on prize money won during the season, calculated using a points-based system.

See also
2019 Danish Golf Tour
2019 Swedish Golf Tour (women)

Notes

References

Swedish Golf Tour
Swedish Golf Tour